Mandisa Sibongile Mashego (born 26 August 1973) is a South African politician and feminist. A former member of the Economic Freedom Fighters (EFF), she served as the party's provincial chairperson in Gauteng from 2018 to 2020. She was also a Member of the Gauteng Provincial Legislature from 2014 to 2020.

Early life
Mashego was born in King William's Town, Cape Province, to a black mother and a white father. She grew up in the Mayfern township of Nelspruit. She obtained a B-Tech in Public Relations from the Durban University of Technology.

Political career
Mashego joined the African National Congress (ANC) while still a student. She left the ANC in 2012 and soon joined the EFF. She was elected as a Member of the Gauteng Provincial Legislature in 2014 and the following year, she was appointed acting provincial chairperson of the EFF following the resignation of Zorro Boshielo. Mashego was elected provincial chairperson for a full term in 2018 and consequently became the party's second elected female provincial chairperson.

Political views
Mashego describes herself as a feminist and an opponent of patriarchy. She said in an interview with the Mail & Guardian that the replacement of the party's first female provincial chairperson, Betty Diale, "saddened" her.

In April 2020, Mashego announced that she supports the reintroduction of the death penalty in South Africa.

Tensions with Julius Malema
In December 2019 at the EFF's national elective conference, Mashego opposed Marshall Dlamini for the position of Secretary-General. Her opposition to Dlamini caused tensions between her and party leader Julius Malema. Malema later suggested in a tweet, which caused speculation, that Mashego was planning on defecting to former Johannesburg mayor Herman Mashaba's party.

In February 2020, the Sunday World newspaper reported that Mashego had resigned as provincial chairperson and as a Member of the Gauteng Provincial Legislature. The EFF disputed this claim and Mashego later denied that she had resigned.

On 31 March 2020, Mashego resigned as EFF provincial chairperson and also from the provincial legislature. Deputy chairperson Itani Mukwevho was named her successor. In August 2020, Mashego made an appearance at the launch of Mashaba's political party, ActionSA.

In January 2021, Mashego announced that she had joined the Abantu Batho Congress.

Personal life
Mashego has not been married and has one daughter.

Notes

References

External links
Mandisa Mashego – People's Assembly

Living people
Xhosa people
1973 births
Economic Freedom Fighters politicians
People from the Eastern Cape
Women members of provincial legislatures of South Africa
People from Qonce
People from Mpumalanga
People from Gauteng
People from Johannesburg
South African feminists